Night Mayor is a 2009 short film by Guy Maddin, about a fictional inventor in Winnipeg who uses the Aurora Borealis to broadcast images of Canada from coast to coast in 1939, until the Canadian government shuts down his illegal project.

The National Film Board of Canada, which was founded in 1939, commissioned Maddin to create a film for its 70th anniversary. In making Night Mayor, Maddin was inspired by his experience researching the NFB's film archives for his 2007 film, My Winnipeg, stating:

The film's main character uses a fictional device called the "Telemelodium" to broadcast his images, which is based on the Telharmonium, an early electronic musical instrument.

Night Mayor was produced by the NFB in Winnipeg and received the Best Experimental Short award at the 2010 South by Southwest festival. It premiered at the Toronto International Film Festival.

References

External links
Behind the scenes of Guy Maddin’s melodramatic short Night Mayor, NFB Blog

2009 films
Canadian science fiction short films
Films directed by Guy Maddin
Films set in Winnipeg
Films shot in Winnipeg
National Film Board of Canada short films
Canadian black-and-white films
2000s Canadian films
Canadian avant-garde and experimental short films